George Gipps (29 December 1783 – 26 April 1869) of Howletts, near Canterbury, Kent, was an English politician.

He was born the eldest son of George Gipps, MP of Harbledown, near Canterbury, Kent and educated at Charterhouse School (1793),  St. John’s College, Cambridge (1801) and Lincoln's Inn (1805). In 1816 he purchased the recently rebuilt Howletts House, between Littlebourne and Bekesbourne, where he and his wife lived until their deaths.

He was a Member of Parliament (MP) for Ripon 1807 to 1826.

He married Jane, the daughter of John Bowdler of Hayes. He had 6 sons (3 of whom predeceased him) and 5 daughters. The residue of his estate passed to his son George.

References

1783 births
1869 deaths
People from the City of Canterbury
People educated at Charterhouse School
Alumni of St John's College, Cambridge
Members of Lincoln's Inn
Members of the Parliament of the United Kingdom for English constituencies
UK MPs 1807–1812
UK MPs 1812–1818
UK MPs 1818–1820
UK MPs 1820–1826
UK MPs 1826–1830